3317 Paris, provisional designation , is a large Jupiter trojan from the Trojan camp, approximately  in diameter. It was discovered on 26 May 1984 by American astronomer couple Carolyn and Eugene Shoemaker at Palomar Observatory in California, United States. The unusual and likely spherical T-type asteroid is one of the largest Jupiter trojans and has a rotation period of 7.1 hours. It was named after Trojan prince Paris from Greek mythology.

Orbit and classification 

Paris is located in the  Lagrangian point, 60° behind Jupiter in the so-called Trojan camp. It is also a non-family asteroid of the Jovian background population.

It orbits the Sun at a distance of 4.6–5.9 AU once every 11 years and 11 months (4,359 days; semi-major axis of 5.22 AU). Its orbit has an eccentricity of 0.13 and an inclination of 28° with respect to the ecliptic.

Physical characteristics 

In the SMASS classification, Paris is a rare T-type asteroid, while in the Bus–DeMeo classification it is a dark D-type asteroid, the most common type among the Jupiter trojans. Its V–I color index of 0.95 is typical for D-type asteroids.

Rotation period 

Several rotational lightcurve have been obtained since November 1990, when the first photometric observations of Paris – made by Italian astronomer Stefano Mottola, using the ESO 1-metre telescope at La Silla Observatory in Chile – gave a rotation period of  hours with a brightness variation of  magnitude. In July 1998, Mottola measured an identical period with an amplitude of 0.10 at Calar Alto Observatory in Spain.

Follow-up observations by Robert Stephens at the Center for Solar System Studies during 2016–2017 measured a period of 7.048 and 7.091 hours, each with an amplitude of 0.11 magnitude, superseding a period of 7.08 hours by René Roy and Federico Manzini reported in 2008 and 2009, respectively. The low brightness variation measured in all photometric observations is also indicative of a spherical, rather than elongated shape.

Diameter and albedo 

An occultation of a star by Paris was measured on 17 August 2010, and gave a major and minor occultation axis of  kilometers (poor fit).

According to the surveys carried out by the Infrared Astronomical Satellite IRAS, the Japanese Akari satellite and the NEOWISE mission of NASA's Wide-field Infrared Survey Explorer, Paris measures between 116.26 and 120.45 kilometers in diameter and its surface has an albedo between 0.055 and 0.0626. The Collaborative Asteroid Lightcurve Link derives an albedo of 0.0625 and adopts a diameter of 116.26 kilometers from IRAS, based on an absolute magnitude of 8.3.

In the catalogs of the three mentioned surveys above, Paris is the 6th, 10th and 11th largest Jupiter trojan, respectively.

Naming 

This minor planet was named from Greek mythology, after prince Paris, one of the many sons of King Priam of Troy. His abduction of Helen of Troy, wife of Menelaus, gave cause to the Trojan War. The official naming citation was published by the Minor Planet Center on 27 December 1985.

In culture 
 In Schlock Mercenary several characters are held hostage by the mob in some corporate offices located on 3317 Paris.

Notes

References

External links 
 Asteroid Lightcurve Database (LCDB), query form (info )
 Dictionary of Minor Planet Names, Google books
 Asteroids and comets rotation curves, CdR – Observatoire de Genève, Raoul Behrend
 Discovery Circumstances: Numbered Minor Planets (1)-(5000) – Minor Planet Center
 
 

003317
Discoveries by Eugene Merle Shoemaker
Discoveries by Carolyn S. Shoemaker
Named minor planets
003317
19840526